The 1970–71 season was Colchester United's 29th season in their history and their third successive season in the fourth tier of English football, the Fourth Division. Alongside competing in the Fourth Division, the club also participated in the FA Cup and the League Cup.

Colchester reached the FA Cup quarter-final, famously beating First Division Leeds United 3–2 at Layer Road in the fifth round. They had already defeated Ringmer, Cambridge United, Barnet and Rochdale along the way, before being defeated 5–0 by Everton at Goodison Park. Owing to their cup run, Colchester's league form stuttered, ending the campaign in sixth place, while they suffered a second round exit in the League Cup after being beaten by Birmingham City following a replay.

Season overview
During the summer of 1970, manager Dick Graham increased the average age of his Colchester squad by signing a number of ageing players, including ex-England international Ray Crawford, Brian Garvey, John Kurila, Mick Mahon and Brian Owen. During the season, both Owen and Roy Massey suffered serious or career ending injuries, forcing Graham into signing Brian Lewis and Dave Simmons.

The 1970–71 season is most notable for Colchester's famous FA Cup run. In the first round, the U's disposed of non-League Ringmer courtesy of a Ray Crawford hat-trick. They then completed a cup double over Cambridge United, beating them 5–0 in the first round of the League Cup and then 3–0 in the second round of the FA Cup. Colchester defeated further non-League opposition in the third round, winning against Barnet at Underhill Stadium. The U's trailed 3–1 with five minutes remaining of their fourth round tie with Rochdale before staging a late comeback to earn a 3–3 draw and a Layer Road replay, where they thrashed Rochdale 5–0. This earned them a home tie against First Division side Leeds United, a side top of the League and who boasted ten internationals in their side.

Leeds United were at the time one of the best teams in the country. However, Dick Graham's side set out to frustrate Leeds by suppressing their usual wing play and playing direct football instead. Chairs and other obstacles were placed by the sidelines to produce an illusion of a narrow playing surface. Colchester found themselves 3–0 ahead after two goals from Ray Crawford and one from Dave Simmons. However, Leeds began to fight back, pulling back two goals with 17-minutes remaining, before Colchester goalkeeper Graham Smith produced a phenomenal save to deny Mick Jones with the score at 3–2. Colchester held on to record a famous victory and one of the most notable FA Cup giant-killings.

With the U's in the quarter-finals, they were drawn against Everton at Goodison Park. Dick Graham's Grandad's Army finally succumbed to defeated by a 5–0 scoreline in front of a crowd of 53,028.

Colchester's cup run had a negative impact on their league form. With fixtures backing up, a run of 17 league games following their cup exit until the end of the season proved too much as they finished the campaign in sixth position, two points shy of promotion.

Players

Transfers

In

 Total spending:  ~ £14,000

Out

 Total incoming:  ~ £8,000

Loans out

Match details

Fourth Division

Results round by round

League table

Matches

League Cup

FA Cup

Squad statistics

Appearances and goals

|-
!colspan="14"|Players who appeared for Colchester who left during the season

|}

Goalscorers

Disciplinary record

Clean sheets
Number of games goalkeepers kept a clean sheet.

Player debuts
Players making their first-team Colchester United debut in a fully competitive match.

See also
List of Colchester United F.C. seasons

References

General
Books

Websites

Specific

1970-71
English football clubs 1970–71 season